Paul Due (13 August 1835 – 26 February 1919) was a Norwegian architect and significant contributor to the stations built by the Norwegian State Railways.

Biography
Paul Due was born in Kristiansand, Norway. He graduated in engineering science at Leibniz University Hannover in the years 1852–1856. After graduating, he traveled to the United States, where he was first assistant in the U.S. Coast Survey, then from 1857 to 1859 employed at the architectural office in Chicago and then in New York City, where he executed drawings for renovation of City Hall. From 1860 to 1865 he lived in Charleston, Virginia. Among other things he planned fortifications  at Richmond, Virginia for the Confederacy during the American Civil War.

When he returned to Norway, he designed 23 buildings in Drammen after the city was hit by the great fire in 1866. He worked with Bernhard Christoph Steckmest (1846–1926) in the firm of Due & Steckmest from 1870-1890. During this period, the firm provided plans for a number of notable buildings in Oslo. After ending their cooperation in 1890, Due worked as a railway architect for the Norwegian State Railways until 1912. During this period he designed more than 150 railway stations, including the stations at Hamar, Kristiansand, Levanger and Kornsjø. One of his most important buildings from this time period, the Hamar Railway Station dating from 1896, replaced former wooden buildings by architects Georg Andreas Bull and Balthazar Lange.

Due was co-founder and chairman of the Norwegian Engineering and Architectural Association. He served as a member of the tax commission 1872-80, and a member of the Oslo Building Commission from 1884 to 1888. In 1907, he was a member of the evaluation committee for the competition of the Nidaros Cathedral West Front. He became an honorary member of the Society of Architects in 1899 and an honorary member of Norway's Engineering and Architectural Association in 1887. During 1897, he was knighted in the Royal Norwegian Order of St. Olav.

Personal life
Paul Due was born in Christiania as the son of Oluf Christian Due and Anna Catharine Vibe, and through his father a nephew of Prime Minister Frederik Due. He married Francisca Wilhelmine Witte (1834–1918) in 1858, while they were living in Texas. They had six children. One of their sons was noted architect Paul Armin Due.

Selected work of Due & Steckmest

1872 - Parkveien 43, Oslo
1873-1875 - villaen Lykkeberg i Lykkebergparken, Fredrikstad
1873 - Leiegårder i Inkognitogaten 16, Oslo
1875 - Onsumslottet i St. Halvards gate 33, Oslo,
1875 - Dues egen villa i Inkognitogaten 14, Oslo
1877 - Parkveien 41a, Oslo
1880-1881 - Boligkomplekset på Sehesteds plass, Oslo
1881 - Uranienborg terrasse 11, Oslo
1883 - St. Edmunds kirke
1885-1889 - Boligkomplekset på Solli plass, Oslo
1887 - Ringnesslottet, Colletts gate 43,  Oslo
1889 - Uranienborg terrasse 9,  Oslo
1889 - Stenersgata 24, Oslo

References

Architects from Oslo
Norwegian State Railways (1883–1996) people
1835 births
1919 deaths
People from Kristiansand
People from Vest-Agder
Norwegian railway architects
Architects from Charleston, West Virginia